Bokakhat is a town in Assam and a Municipality Board in Golaghat district  in the state of Assam, India. It is about 23 km away from the world heritage site Kaziranga National Park. Bokakhat town is situated almost in the middle of Assam. It is the headquarters of Bokakhat subdivision. The town is base to many nearby tourist places and is well connected to other cities and towns by road. The Kaipho Langso waterfall, an important picnic spot surrounded with magnificent views, lies in Karbi Anglong 13 km away from Bokakhat. Other nearby attractions include the ruins of the ancient Numaligarh and the Deoparbat, the tea gardens of Hatikhuli, Methoni, Diffloo Behora and Borsapori and also the coffee and rubber plantations. The nearest airports are at Jorhat and Guwahati. The nearest railway stations are Badulipar and Furkating.

Demographics

 India census, Bokakhat had a population of 2 Lakhs. Males constitute 54% of the population and females 46%. Bokakhat has an average literacy rate of 78%, higher than the national average of 59.5%; with male literacy of 83% and female literacy of 73%. 11% of the population is under 6 years of age.

Attractions

The main attractions of the area are natural spots, wildlife, temples, historical sites, archaeological remains, monasteries (satras), industries, various festivals, tea gardens, hills, handicrafts, hand loom products, roadside hotels and tourist lodges. Almost all the requirements of modern tourism can be fulfilled by Kaziranga National Park, Kaziranga National Orchid & Bio-Diversity Park, NRL and the Butterfly Garden, boating and sight-seeing of the park by boat, Karbi Anglong, golf court, Oriole Park, Kaipho Langso Waterfalls, Chikan Ata than, Deo Pahar, Kuruabahi Satra, etc.

History
Bokakhat was formerly known as Namdoiang, as it was located far downstream of the river Doiang.

Education
Bokakhat area is full of Govt. and Private L.P, M.E and also High Schools with good faculties. Other higher study institutes like J.D.S.G College (Arts & Commerce), C.N.B College (Science) etc. and some private colleges are also located at the town.

Transport
Bokakhat is well connected by roadways. The National Highway 715 passes through Bokakhat.

Politics
Bokakhat is part of Kaliabor (Lok Sabha constituency) and Bokakhat is a Rajya sabha constituency.

Bokakhat News
Bokakhat News

Festivals 
Being a cosmopolitan town, people of Bokakhat celebrates many Indian festivals from different religions throughout the year. Since, the majority of the population is Assamese, the Bihu is the prime festival of the town. Apart from that, the people celebrates other festivals like Durga Puja, Diwali, Sankardev and Madhavdev tithis, Eid, Christmas, Horinam Sankirtan very well.
Assamese is the largest community in Bokakhat with other communities like Bengali, Bihari, Marwari, Sikh, Jain, Nepali, Etc.

References

External links
Bokakhat subdivision Website

Cities and towns in Golaghat district
Golaghat district